Going Home (1973) is the first novel written by the American author Danielle Steel.

1973 American novels
American romance novels
Novels by Danielle Steel
Chick lit novels
Doubleday (publisher) books
1973 debut novels
Contemporary romance novels